Braffetsville is an unincorporated community in Darke County, in the U.S. state of Ohio.

History
Braffetsville was laid out in 1834. The town site was located on the railroad.

References

Unincorporated communities in Darke County, Ohio
Unincorporated communities in Ohio